Ben Taskar (March 3, 1977 – November 18, 2013) was a professor and researcher in the area of machine learning and applications to computational linguistics and computer vision.  He was a Magerman Term Associate Professor for Computer and Information Science at University of Pennsylvania. He co-directed PRiML: Penn Research in Machine Learning, a joint venture between the School of Engineering and Wharton. He was also a Distinguished Research Fellow at the Annenberg Center for Public Policy. At the University of Washington, he held the Boeing Professorship.

He was the first person to define Max-margin Markov networks and a pioneer in statistical relational learning.

References

Articles
 UW CSE News, Ben Taskar memorial, https://news.cs.washington.edu/2013/11/18/ben-taskar-1977-2013/
 "Geek Wire", UW computer science professor Ben Taskar passes away at 36 news, http://www.geekwire.com/2013/uw-computer-science-professor-ben-taskar-dies-37/

2013 deaths
American computer scientists
Machine learning researchers
Artificial intelligence researchers
Logic programming researchers
University of California, Berkeley faculty
University of Pennsylvania faculty
University of Washington faculty
Stanford University alumni
1977 births